Keith Anthony Lamar Williams (born May 16, 1973) is an American bodybuilder and former American football player. He and his wife reside in Lawrence, Kansas.

Physical statistics
Age: 45
Height: 5'10”
Weight: Contest 245-250 lbs (111–113 kg or 17 stone, 7 lbs to 17 stone, 9 lbs)  Off Season 287

NPC Contest Record
September 2008 NPC North Americans - Superheavyweight -4th 
July 2008 NPC Flex Wheeler Classic, Superheavyweight -Class and Overall Winner 
June 2008 NPC JR. Nationals, Super heavyweight division placed - 2nd 
July 2007 USA Championships Las Vegas, NV Super heavyweight division placed - 8th 
June 2007 Jr. National Championships Chicago, IL Super heavyweight division - 4th 
July 2006 USA Championships Las Vegas, NV Super heavyweight division - 11th 
July 2006 Mr. Minnesota/ Mr. Midwest Super heavyweight Champion 
June 2006 Junior Nationals Chicago, IL Heavyweight division - 4th 
April 2005 Gopher State Competition MN Heavyweight Champion

Football

(5-11, 220, 4.20)

Positions: RB, KR, Special Teams Specialist, CB

Minnesota Vikings 
Signed February 2002 as DB 
Green Bay Packers 
(CB/KR) Signed: April 12, 1999 
St. Cloud State University: 
1995: All-Conference in football for SCSU North Central Conference All-American

References
Packers, retrieved  
Vikings, Retrieved June 14, 2009. 
"Keith Williams - Junior Nationals Bodybuilding, Fitness & Figure Championships 2008". Muscular Development Online Magazine,  Retrieved .
St. Cloud State University, 

1973 births
Living people
American bodybuilders